Platanthera chapmanii, common name Chapman's fringed orchid, is an orchid that grows in Northern Florida and adjacent southeastern Georgia as well as in southeastern Texas. It is a monocot in the family Orchidaceae. It is part of the genus Platanthera, meaning wide anther in Latin.

References

chapmanii
Orchids of the United States
Flora of the Eastern United States